Mikhail Kizeyev (born March 3, 1978, Ivanovo) is a Russian political figure and deputy of the 8th State Duma. In 2015, he was granted a Candidate of Sciences in Medicine degree.

After graduating from the Ivanovo State Medical Academy, Kizeyev started working as a medical orderly at the Ivanovo City Clinical Hospital No. 4. In 2003, he was appointed a microsurgeon at the eye department of city clinical hospital No.4. From 2010 to 2021, he was the chief physician at the Medical center "Reshma" of the Federal Medical-Biological Agency. From 2015 to 2021, he was a deputy of the Ivanovo Oblast Duma. Since September 2021, he has served as deputy of the 8th State Duma.

References

1978 births
Living people
United Russia politicians
21st-century Russian politicians
Eighth convocation members of the State Duma (Russian Federation)